Sport Lisboa e Benfica, commonly known as Benfica, is a professional futsal team based in Lisbon, Portugal, that plays in the Liga Portuguesa de Futsal.

Since its creation in 2001, the team has been a constant challenger for the domestic championship. They won at least one trophy per season between 2005 and 2013. In 2006–07 and 2011–12, Benfica won all Portuguese competitions at the time (3). Benfica became the first Portuguese team to win the UEFA Futsal Champions League (then "UEFA Futsal Cup"), in 2010, and were ranked first in the competition's ranking two years later.

Benfica is currently the second-most decorated team in Portugal, with a total of 27 trophies: 8 Portuguese League titles, 7 Portuguese Cups, 4 League Cups, 8 Super Cups, and 1 UEFA Futsal Champions League.

History

Establishment (2001–2004)
Established on 13 September 2001, Benfica merged with futsal team Olímpico and became managed by company MPM on 2 June, with Benfica only providing the facilities, medical staff and kits. This union allowed Benfica to participate in the 2001–02 first division. In their debut, Benfica were runners-up, losing 3–2 to Miramar Futsal Clube with the decisive goal coming from a future Benfica glory, André Lima. Benfica's notable players in their first season were Portuguese internationals Naná, Vitinho I, Drula and Nelito, who were coached by Alípio Matos.

The following season, with new players such as André Lima, Rogério Vilela, Pedro Costa and Arnaldo Pereira, Benfica won their first league title, against Sporting CP, their first Taça de Portugal, and their first SuperTaça.

In 2003–04, notable players Ciço and Ricardinho joined Benfica. Benfica reached the 2003–04 UEFA Futsal Cup final, losing 7–5 on aggregate to Interviu.

Adil Amarante years (2004–2008)
In 2004–05, Adil Amarante replaced Alípio Matos and added Nelito, Estrela and Pica Pau. Benfica won the Portuguese Cup against Boavista FC and the second league title against Sporting.

The next season, players such as Wilson, Côco and Sidnei joined Benfica, while Miguel Almeida and Zé Maria left. Benfica lost the Portuguese Cup to Sporting in the Final Four, and then the league.

In 2006–07, Benfica improved their squad with new players such as Gonçalo Alves, Bebé, Pedro Costa, Zé Maria and Estrela, who returned. Nelito ended his career. Benfica conquered the Super Cup. In May Benfica won another Portuguese Cup and by June another league
 
In the 2007–08 season, Arnaldo Pereira and Miguel Almeida returned, while Estrela left. Benfica started the season by winning the Super Cup. In January, César Paulo joined Benfica. In March, Adil Amarante left in disagreement with Benfica about his new contract, and was replaced by Beto Aranha, who lead Benfica to their first back-to-back champion titles.

André Lima years (2008–2010)
In July 2008, despite being in charge only for four months, Benfica replaced Beto Aranha with former player and coach, André Lima. The only reinforcement was Pedrinho, while Miguel Almeida left. Benfica lost the Super Cup but won the Portuguese Cup, and the third league title in a row for the first time.

In 2009–10, Benfica hired Davi and Marinho, and went on winning their 13th title, the domestic Super Cup.

On 25 April 2010, Benfica became European champions by conquering the UEFA Futsal Cup, after defeating Luparense by 8–4 in the semi-finals, they beat Interviu 3–2 in the final; Benfica conceded first by Marquinho, but Joel Queirós and then Arnaldo put Benfica in the lead, Interviu equalised by Betão, but Davi in the final minutes sealed the historic victory.

In the remainder of the season, Benfica lost the Portuguese Cup to Belenenses and then the league to Sporting.

2010–present
In the 2010–11 season, coach Paulo Fernandes, who had just won the league for Sporting, replaced European champion André Lima. Ricardinho left and was replaced by Diece. Another addition was Diego Sol who arrived from Belenenses, and Teka from Sporting. In this season Benfica lost the Portuguese Cup, and then the league in three matches, despite winning the regular phase. In European competitions, Benfica finished fourth in the 2010–11 UEFA Futsal Cup.

In 2011–12, Benfica added Marcão, Dentinho and Bruno Coelho. The season was better than the previous one as Benfica won all three competitions they entered: the Super Cup, Portuguese Cup and the league. Ricardinho returned in January on a 6 month-loan but failed to make an impact, being suspended for three matches in the final.

In 2012–13, Benfica hired Vítor Hugo
and Nené. On 2 September 2012, they won their sixth Super Cup against Modicus (5–3) and tied with Sporting in terms of overall titles (17). After a series of bad results, including an early exit of the UEFA Futsal Cup, Paulo Fernandes was sacked and replaced by João Freitas Pinto. However, Benfica failed to retain the league title, losing 3–1 in the final against Sporting. In the offseason, Benfica did not renew the contract of Davi, Diego Sol, Diece, Marinho and César Paulo, replacing them with Ricardo Fernandes, Pablo del Moral, Rafael Henmi, Serginho, Bruno Pinto, Paulinho, Alan Brandi and Ivo Oliveira.

On 14 June 2015, Benfica became Portuguese champions for the seventh time and achieved their seventh double, defeating Sporting on penalties (2–3) in the fourth match of playoffs final. Benfica reached the playoff finals without defeat.

In August 2015, Benfica beat AD Fundão 6–3 and won the Super Cup. Benfica won again the Super Cup in October 2016, for a record eighth time, defeating Sporting 3–2. In the end of the season, Benfica beat Burinhosa and won their seventh Portuguese Cup (record). Later on, in January 2018, Benfica won their first League Cup with a 5–2 victory over Sporting.

Season to season

Results in international competition

Note: Benfica score is always listed first. H = home ground; A = away

Players

Current squad

Other players under contract

Honours

Domestic competitions
According to Benfica's official website
 Liga Portuguesa
 Winners (8): 2002–03, 2004–05, 2006–07, 2007–08, 2008–09, 2011–12, 2014–15, 2018–19
 Taça de Portugal
 Winners (7): 2002–03, 2004–05, 2006–07, 2008–09, 2011–12, 2014–15, 2016–17
 Taça da Liga
 Winners (4): 2017–18, 2018–19, 2019–20, 2022–23
 Supertaça de Portugal
 Winners (8): 2003, 2006, 2007, 2009, 2011, 2012, 2015, 2016

International competitions
 UEFA Futsal Champions League
 Winners: 2009–10

Women's current squad

Head coach: Pedro Henriques

Women's honours

Regional competitions
 Lisbon Championship
 Winners (5): 2004–05, 2005–06, 2006–07, 2007–08, 2009–10
 Lisbon Honour Cup
 Winners (10): 2004–05, 2005–06, 2006–07, 2007–08, 2008–09, 2009–10, 2010–11, 2011–12, 2012–13, 2014–15
 Taça de Honra AF Lisboa
 Winners: 2016

National competitions
 Portuguese League
 Winners (5) – record: 2016–17, 2017–18, 2018–19, 2020–21, 2021–22
 Portuguese Cup
 Winners (6) – record: 2013–14, 2015–16, 2016–17, 2017–18, 2018–19, 2019–20
 Taça da Liga
 Winners (2) – record: 2020–21, 2022–23
 Portuguese Super Cup
 Winners (7) – record: 2014, 2016, 2017, 2018, 2019, 2021, 2022

Other competitions
 Iberian Cup
 Winners: 2006–07

References

External links
  

 
Futsal
Futsal clubs in Portugal
Futsal clubs established in 2001
2001 establishments in Portugal